Walter Martin Baumhofer (November 1, 1904September 23, 1987) was an American illustrator notable for his cover paintings seen on the pulp magazines of Street & Smith and other publishers.

Baumhofer's parents immigrated from Germany. His father Henry (Heinrich) came from Oldenburg, his mother Marie from Hanover. He was born and grew up in Brooklyn where his father had become a clerk at a local coffee company and then, in 1918, janitor at an apartment building, a situation which enabled the family to live rent free. Graduating from high school in 1922, Baumhofer went on a scholarship to Pratt Institute, where he studied under Dean Cornwell and H. Winfield Scott.

Illustrations
In 1925, he began drawing interior illustrations for Adventure magazine. Scott suggested he submit cover paintings to pulps, and the following year his first pulp cover appeared on Danger Trail. He moved on to do covers for Doc Savage, Pete Rice, Dime Mystery, Dime Detective  
and The Spider. Joining the American Artists agency in 1937, he sold to slick magazines, including The American Magazine, The American Weekly, Collier's, Cosmopolitan, Esquire, McCalls, Redbook and Woman's Day. In the 1950s he worked for men's adventure magazines, such as Argosy, Sports Afield and True.

Fine art
In 1945, Baumhofer and his wife Alureda moved to Long Island. Retiring from freelance magazine illustration, he created portraits, landscapes and Western scenes for fine art galleries. With the decline of pulps and reader's magazines in the late 1950s and early 1960s, due to the rise of the TV as evening entertainment, Baumhofer's illustrations lost its markets. Very few illustration work is known for the 1960s and 1970s.  At the end of his life in the 1980s, he was rediscovered as a celebrated master of pulp and illustration art.

Gallery

References

1904 births
1987 deaths
American illustrators
Artists from Brooklyn
Pulp fiction artists